The British Australian Tramway was operated by the British Australian Timber company at two locations:

 British Australian Tramway, Coffs Harbour, logging railway
 British Australian Tramway, Woolgoolga, logging railway